Lioness is the sixth studio album by Norwegian rock musician Sivert Høyem, released in 2016.

Track listing

Personnel
Sivert Høyem - Vocals, guitar (acoustic), composition, arrangement, production
Øystein Frantzvåg - Bass guitar, double bass, guitar (baritone)
Christer Knutsen - Guitar (electric), hi string guitar (acoustic), marxophone, organ, piano, celeste, vocals (backing), composition, arrangement, production, engineering
Børge Fjordheim - Drums, percussion

Guest musicians
Marie Monroe - Vocals (track 5)
Cato Salsa - Guitar (electric)
Inga Byrkjeland - Cello
Tove Margrethe Falkenberg Erikstad - Cello
Audun Sandvik - Cello
Jon Wien Sønstebø - Viola 
Nora Taksdal - Viola
Bjarne Magnus Jensen - Violin
Andre Orvik - Violin
Morten Barrikmo Engebretsen - Clarinet (bass)

Production
Jan Martin Smørdal - Conductor, string arrangements
Bjarne Stensli - Engineering, production
Tchad Blake - Mixing
Greg Calbi - Mastering
Bjørn Opsahl - Photography
Desiree Mattsson Margaret - Sleeve photo

Charts

References

2016 albums
Sivert Høyem albums